Eisa Mohammed (Arabic:عيسى محمد) (born 19 April 1980) is an Emirati footballer .

References

External links
 

Emirati footballers
1980 births
Living people
Al-Shaab CSC players
Al Shabab Al Arabi Club Dubai players
Khor Fakkan Sports Club players
Masfout Club players
UAE Pro League players
UAE First Division League players
Association football defenders